In mathematics, particularly in calculus,  a stationary point of a differentiable function of one variable is a point on the graph of the function where the function's derivative is zero. Informally, it is a point where the function "stops" increasing or decreasing (hence the name).

For a differentiable function of several real variables, a stationary point is a point on the surface of the graph where all its partial derivatives are zero (equivalently, the gradient is zero).

Stationary points are easy to visualize on the graph of a function of one variable: they correspond to the points on the graph where the tangent is horizontal (i.e., parallel to the -axis). For a function of two variables, they correspond to the points on the graph where the tangent plane is parallel to the  plane.

Turning points
A turning point is a point at which the derivative changes sign. A turning point may be either a relative maximum or a relative minimum (also known as local minimum and maximum). If the function is differentiable, then a turning point is a stationary point; however not all stationary points are turning points. If the function is twice differentiable, the stationary points that are not turning points are horizontal inflection points.

Classification

Isolated stationary points of a  real valued function  are classified into four kinds, by the first derivative test:

 a local minimum (minimal turning point or relative minimum) is one where the derivative of the function changes from negative to positive;
 a local maximum (maximal turning point or relative maximum) is one where the derivative of the function changes from positive to negative;

 a rising point of inflection (or inflexion) is one where the derivative of the function is positive on both sides of the stationary point; such a point marks a change in concavity;
 a falling point of inflection (or inflexion) is one where the derivative of the function is negative on both sides of the stationary point; such a point marks a change in concavity.

The first two options are collectively known as "local extrema". Similarly a point that is either a global (or absolute) maximum or a global (or absolute) minimum is called a global (or absolute) extremum. The last two options—stationary points that are not local extremum—are known as saddle points.

By Fermat's theorem, global extrema must occur (for a  function) on the boundary or at stationary points.

Curve sketching

Determining the position and nature of stationary points aids in curve sketching of differentiable functions. Solving the equation f'(x) = 0 returns the x-coordinates of all stationary points; the y-coordinates are trivially the function values at those x-coordinates.
The specific nature of a stationary point at x can in some cases be determined by examining the second derivative f''(x):
 If f''(x) < 0, the stationary point at x is concave down; a maximal extremum.
 If f''(x) > 0, the stationary point at x is concave up; a minimal extremum.
 If f''(x) = 0, the nature of the stationary point must be determined by way of other means, often by noting a sign change around that point.

A more straightforward way of determining the nature of a stationary point is by examining the function values between the stationary points (if the function is defined and continuous between them).

A simple example of a point of inflection is the function f(x) = x3. There is a clear change of concavity about the point x = 0, and we can prove this by means of calculus. The second derivative of f is the everywhere-continuous 6x, and at x = 0,  f′′ = 0, and the sign changes about this point. So x = 0 is a point of inflection.

More generally, the stationary points of a real valued function  are those
points x0 where the derivative in every direction equals zero, or equivalently, the gradient is zero.

Example
For the function f(x) = x4  we have f'(0) = 0 and f''(0) = 0. Even though f''(0) = 0, this point is not a point of inflection.  The reason is that the sign of f'''(x) changes from negative to positive.

For the function f(x) = sin(x) we have f'(0) ≠ 0 and  f''(0) = 0. But this is not a stationary point, rather it is a point of inflection. This is because the concavity changes from concave downwards to concave upwards and the sign of f'(x) does not change; it stays positive.

For the function f(x) = x3 we have f'(0) = 0 and f''(0) = 0. This is both a stationary point and a point of inflection. This is because the concavity changes from concave downwards to concave upwards and the sign of f'(x'') does not change; it stays positive.

See also
 Optimization (mathematics)
 Fermat's theorem
 Derivative test
 Fixed point (mathematics)
 Saddle point

References

External links
 Inflection Points of Fourth Degree Polynomials — a surprising appearance of the golden ratio at cut-the-knot

Differential calculus